House Rules is an American sitcom television series created by Roberto Benabib and Karl Fink, that aired from March 9 to June 8, 1998, on NBC. The show stars Maria Pitillo, Bradley White, and David Newsom.

Premise
Three friends from childhood, Casey, a District Attorney, Thomas, a reporter, and William, a medical student, live together in a house in Denver, Colorado.

Cast
Maria Pitillo as Casey Farrell
Bradley White as Thomas Riley
David Newsom as William McCuskey

Episodes

References

External links

1998 American television series debuts
1998 American television series endings
1990s American sitcoms
NBC original programming
English-language television shows
Television shows set in Colorado
Television series by Sony Pictures Television
Television series by Universal Television